Robert Hugo Philip Platz (born 16 August 1951) is a German classical composer.

Born in Baden-Baden, Platz studied music theory and composition (with Wolfgang Fortner), musicology (with Elmar Budde) and piano in Freiburg im Breisgau, Germany, between 1970 and 1973. He studied later with Karlheinz Stockhausen at the Staatliche Hochschule für Musik in Cologne. In 1977 he took examinations in conducting (with Francis Travis) in Freiburg, and did a series of computer courses at IRCAM in 1980. Since 1990 he has been teaching composition at the Conservatorium Maastricht, Netherlands. Platz gives workshops and masterclasses in Poland, the Netherlands, Italy, Japan, and the United States, and he has taught at the Darmstädter Ferienkurse für Neue Musik.

References

Further reading

External links

1951 births
Living people
21st-century classical composers
20th-century classical composers
German classical composers
German male conductors (music)
Pupils of Karlheinz Stockhausen
German male classical composers
20th-century German composers
Academic staff of the Maastricht Academy of Music
People from Baden-Baden
21st-century German composers
20th-century German conductors (music)
21st-century German conductors (music)
20th-century German male musicians
21st-century German male musicians